The Journal of Official Statistics is a peer-reviewed  scientific journal that publishes papers related to official statistics. It is published by Statistics Sweden, the national statistical office of Sweden. The journal was established in 1985, when it replaced the Swedish language journal Statistisk Tidskrift (Statistical Review). It publishes four issues each year.

Abstracting and indexing 

Journal of Official Statistics is indexed in the Current Index to Statistics.

References

External links 

 , 2013–present.
 Archive, 1985–2012.

Publications established in 1985
Statistics journals
Quarterly journals
English-language journals
Official statistics
Open access journals